These are the official results of the Men's Discus Throw event at the 1987 World Championships in Rome, Italy. There were a total of 27 participating athletes, with the final held on Friday September 4, 1987.

Medalists

Schedule
All times are Central European Time (UTC+1)

Abbreviations
All results shown are in metres

Records

Qualification
 Held on Thurdsday 1987-09-03

Final

See also
 1984 Men's Olympic Discus Throw (Los Angeles)
 1986 Men's European Championships Discus Throw (Stuttgart)
 1988 Men's Olympic Discus Throw (Seoul)
 1990 Men's European Championships Discus Throw (Split)

References
 Results

D
Discus throw at the World Athletics Championships